Sagalassa triphaenoides is a moth in the family Brachodidae. It is found in Chile.

References

Natural History Museum Lepidoptera generic names catalog

Brachodidae
Endemic fauna of Chile
Moths described in 1883